Patricia Bernard is an Australian writer of speculative fiction.

Biography
Bernard was born in 1942 in Melbourne, Australia. Bernard's first work to be published was in 1981 under the pseudonym of Judy Bernard-Waite with The Riddle of the Trumpalar which was written with Judy Nunn and Fiona Waite. In 1983 she wrote her first solo book, We Are Tam, and in 1986 she, along with Nunn and Waite, wrote the sequel to The Riddle of the Trumpalar, entitled Challenge of the Trumpalar. From 1988 to 1999 Bernard wrote six more novels including The Outcast Trilogy and one piece of short-fiction which was featured in an anthology edited by Paul Collins. Book one of The Outcast Trilogy, The Outcast was a short-list nominee for the 1997 Aurealis Award for best young-adult novel but lost to Isobelle Carmody's Greylands and Eye to Eye by Catherine Jinks. During her life Bernard has travelled to many countries including Cuba where she was the first resident of New South Wales to be given a visa for Cuba.

Bibliography

Novels
The Trumpalar
The Riddle of the Trumpalar (1981, as Judy Bernard-Waite) with Judy Nunn and Fiona Waite
Challenge of the Trumpalar (1986, as Judy Bernard-Waite) with Judy Nunn and Fiona Waite

The Outcast Trilogy
The Outcast (1997)
The Punisher (1997)
The Rule Changer (1998)

Other novels
We Are Tam (1983)
Aida's Ghost (1988)
Dream Door of Shinar (1992)
Jacaranda Shadow (1993)
Deadly Sister Love" aka "Ghost walking on water (1999, as P. Scot-Bernard)
Bladers Rule (Another Blader Gang Book) (2001)

Short fiction
"Spook Bus" (1997) in Shivers: A Real Corpse / Spook Bus (ed. Paul Collins)

Non-fiction
With the Kamasutra Under My Arm: An Indian Journey (2005)

Other works
 is a Deadly Exercise (1987)
Kangaroo Kids (1989)
A Cut-Out Model of the Sydney Opera House (198?) with Marcelle Bernard
Monkey Hill Gold (1992)
Jacaranda Shadow (1993)
The Outer Space Spy (1993)
The You Can Do It! Little Book for Busy Students (1993)
JB and the Worry Dolls (1994)
Monster Builder (1996)
Duffy: Everyone's Dog (1997) with Cathy Netherwood
No Sooks on the Starship (1998) with Nick Buttfield
The Rule Changer (1998)
Jumping Dogs and Jellyfish (1999) with Gus Gordon
The Pizza Caper (1999) with Gus GordonWolfman (1999) with Gus GordonThe Stolen Giant Cheesecake (2000)Bladers Rule, or, The Stolen Bag Lady (2001)Dolphin Magic (2001) with Meredith CostainMarucs the mighty (2001) with Penny AzarCool Dude and Honey Magnet (2002)Fords and Flying Machines: The Diary of Jack McLaren (2003)Splash, Dash, Smash! (2004) with Meredith CostainStegosaur Stone (2004)The Mask (2005)Claw of the Dragon: The Diary of Billy Shanghai Hamilton'' (2008)

Source: ISFDB.org, WorldCat.org

References

1942 births
Living people
20th-century Australian novelists
Australian science fiction writers
Women science fiction and fantasy writers
Australian women novelists
21st-century Australian novelists
20th-century Australian women
21st-century Australian women writers